Cynthia Ona Innis (born 1969) is an American painter and visual artist raised in San Diego and based out of Berkeley, California. Her work has been described as "paintings one doesn't look at so much as immerse oneself in", as well as "sensual" and "organic".

Biography 
Innis graduated with a B.A. degree from the University of California at Berkeley and earned her post-graduate M.F.A. degree from Rutgers University in New Brunswick, New Jersey. She has received the James D. Phelan Award in printmaking, a MacDowell Colony Fellowship and Residency award and a Sustainable Arts Foundation award, among other awards and recognition.

Innis has been a visiting art professor and/or faculty member at several prominent universities and arts institutes. Among the institutions where Innis has taught, are the University of California at Berkeley, the San Francisco Art Institute and Boise State University in Boise, Idaho. Her work is represented in the collections of the Fine Arts Museums of San Francisco, San Jose Museum of Art, Berkeley Art Museum Pacific Film Archive, Crocker Art Museum and the Microsoft Art Collection. Innis is represented by the Walter Maciel Gallery in Los Angeles, California.

Personal life

Innis is the daughter of architect Donald Innis and his wife Virginia, a teacher and floral designer. Cynthia Ona Innis is married to Sascha Weiss, Research Chef at Perfect Day. Innis has a daughter with Sascha Weiss and resides in the San Francisco Bay Area. Her sister is film editor Chris Innis.

References

Further reading 
Myers, Holly,"Immersed in an Artists Vision: Cynthia Ona Innis at Walter Maciel Gallery" Los Angeles Times, Friday, March 28, 2008.
Gray, Emma, "Emma Gray's Top LA Ten Picks" Saatchi's Daily Magazine, April 2008.
Kavass, Veronica. "Conversations 3, Amy Globus and Cynthia Ona Innis," Stretcher.org, May 2006.
Myers, Holly. "They're Subtle Yet Absorbing: Cynthia Ona Innis at Walter Maciel Gallery," Los Angeles Times, June 23, 2006.
New American Paintings, Number 37, Open Studios Press.
New Jersey Arts Annual: Fine Arts 1994, Exhibition Catalog, New Jersey State Museum.
Rodriguez, Juan, “Cynthia Innis at the Braunstein/Quay Gallery,” Artweek, Vol. 33, Issue 1, February 2002.
Rubin, Sylvia.“Big Easy,” San Francisco Chronicle Sunday Magazine, Cover and pages 1, 14-18, February 27, 2005.
Shnoor, Chris, “Satin Underground: Boise Exposed in Pink,” Boise Weekly, Vol. 11, June 2003.
Taft, Catherine. "Cynthia Ona Innis at the Walter Maciel Gallery."  ArtReview, August 2006.
Tapley, Brendan. "Open Studio-Painter Cynthia Ona Innis," Artweek, Vol. 34, No. 1, Summer 2005.
Van Proyen, Mark. "'Close Calls: 2006' at Headlands Center for the Arts," Artweek, Vol. 37, Issue 3, April 2006.

1969 births
American women painters
American contemporary painters
Living people
Artists from San Diego
Rutgers University alumni
University of California, Berkeley alumni
20th-century American painters
20th-century American women artists
21st-century American women artists